= Moreira Garcez Building =

- Edifício Moreira Garcez
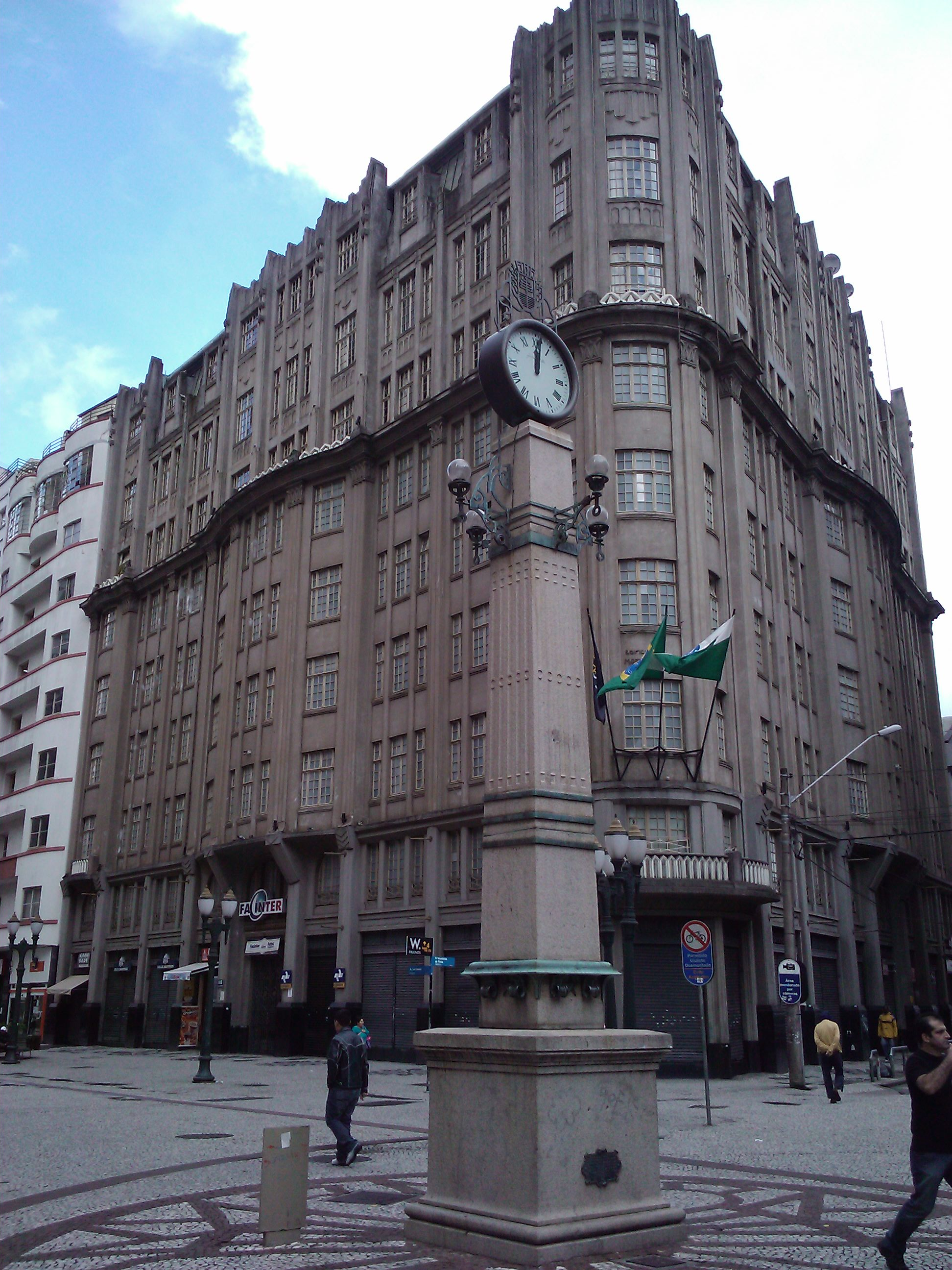
- The Moreira Garcez Building in 2011
- Click on the map for a fullscreen view

General information
- Location: Curitiba, Brazil
- Coordinates: 25°25′57.52″S 49°16′28.9″W

The Moreira Garcez Building (Portuguese: Edifício Moreira Garcez) is a historic building located in Curitiba, Brazil.

== History ==
The construction of the building was conceived in 1926 by Mayor João Cid Moreira Garcez and initiated the following year. Designed by engineer Eduardo Fernando Chavez and built in multiple phases, the Moreira Garcez was inaugurated in 1933 with five floors and a basement, becoming Curitiba’s first skyscraper and, at the time, the third tallest building in Brazil. In 1937, an additional floor was added, while the last two were completed twenty years later, bringing the structure to its current eight floors.

The original idea was to create a luxury hotel, but over the years, the building has served various purposes. Among the most notable, it housed the consulate of Nazi Germany in the 1930s and 1940s, in addition to serving as a shopping center and the headquarters of the Federação Paranaense de Futebol before being converted into an office building.

== Description ==
The building is located at the corner of Avenida Luiz Xavier and Rua Voluntários da Pátria, next to Praça Osório. It features an Art Deco style.
